Kroes is a Dutch surname. Notable people with the surname include:

Doutzen Kroes (born 1985), Dutch model and actress
Evert Kroes (born 1950), Dutch rower
Hans Kroes (born 1965), Dutch swimmer
Iris Kroes (born 1992), Dutch singer and harpist
Neelie Kroes (born 1941), Dutch politician
Wolter Kroes (born 1968), Dutch singer

See also
Croes

Dutch-language surnames